The 1937 Oxford University by-election was held on 27 February 1937.  The by-election was held due to the appointment as provost of Eton College of the incumbent Conservative MP, Lord Hugh Cecil.  It was won by the Independent candidate Arthur Salter.

References

1937 elections in the United Kingdom
1937 in England
20th century in Oxford
By-elections to the Parliament of the United Kingdom in Oxford University
February 1937 events